Nitti: The Enforcer is a made for television movie that is a biography of Al Capone's enforcer Frank Nitti. 
Music for the film was written by Yanni.

Cast

Anthony LaPaglia as Frank Nitti
Vincent Guastaferro as Al Capone
Trini Alvarado as Anna
Michael Moriarty as Hugh Kelly
Bruce Kirby as Anton Cermak 
Mike Starr as Harry Lang

Sources
Nitti: The Enforcer at IMDB

American television films
1988 television films
1988 films
Biographical films about gangsters
Films about the American Mafia
Films about the Chicago Outfit
American crime films
Films about Al Capone
Cultural depictions of Al Capone
Cultural depictions of Frank Nitti
Films set in the 1910s
Films set in the 1920s
Films set in the 1930s
Films set in the 1940s
Films directed by Michael Switzer
1980s English-language films
1980s American films